Anthony Elujoba (born 1948) is a Nigerian professor of  Pharmacognosy, fondly referred to as the "village chemist" because of his involvement in research into medicinal plants. He was acting vice chancellor of Obafemi Awolowo University, Nigeria.

References

See also
List of vice chancellors in Nigeria
Obafemi Awolowo University

1948 births
Living people
Nigerian scientists